Bassem Eid (born 5 February 1958) is a Palestinian living in Jericho who has an extensive career as a Palestinian human rights activist. His initial focus was on human rights violations committed by Israeli armed forces, but for many years has broadened his research to include human rights violations committed by the Palestinian Authority (PA), and the Palestinian armed forces on their own people. He founded the Palestinian Human Rights Monitoring Group in 1996, although it ceased operations in 2011. He now works as a political analyst for Israeli TV and radio.

Biography
He was born in the Jordanian-ruled Old City in East Jerusalem, and spent the first 33 years of his life in the United Nations Refugee Works Agency (UNRWA) refugee camp of Shuafat. He rose to prominence during the first Intifada, the Palestinian uprising, and was a senior field researcher for B’Tselem, the Israeli Information Center for Human Rights in the West Bank. In 1996, he founded the Jerusalem-based Palestinian Human Rights Monitoring Group. He formally ended his work at the group in October 2010. In 2011, the group closed. Since 2003 he has worked as a paid political commentator for Israeli TV and since 2009 he has worked as a commentator on Palestinian politics for Israeli Radio (Reshet Bet).

In 2016, he became the chairman of The Center for Near East Policy Research.

Human rights and advocacy work
In 1997, The Washington Post called Eid, "an internationally recognized rights campaigner."

He publicly condemned the widespread murder of Palestinian dissidents, often for reasons unrelated to the Intifada. In 1995, following his report about the Palestinian Preventative Security Service, he came under attack by some Palestinian leaders for revealing human rights violations committed by the Palestinian Authority (PA). He continued his criticisms of human rights policies of both Israeli and Palestinian armed forces. In 1996, he was arrested by Yasser Arafat's Presidential Guard (Force 17) and denounced as an Israeli agent. He was released after 25 hours following widespread and international condemnation.

In response to the deterioration of the human rights situation under the Palestinian Authority, he founded the Palestinian Human Rights Monitoring Group (PHRMG), which monitored abuses committed by the PA and also dealt to some extent with Israel. It was a nonpartisan human rights organization dedicated to exposing human rights violations and supporting a democratic and pluralistic Palestine. The group closed in 2011.

He has spent 26 years researching UNRWA policies and has written extensively on the subject of UNRWA reform. He also is an outspoken critic of the Boycott, Divestment and Sanctions movement, otherwise known as BDS.

He has traveled widely to lecture on the Palestine-Israel conflict and has attended international conferences. In recent years he has traveled to Canada, Italy, Japan, and South Africa, where he was invited by The South African Jewish Board of Deputies to speak at universities, Australia and New Zealand, where he was a guest of the Australia/Israel & Jewish Affairs Council, and the United States, where he conducted a speaking tour sponsored by pro-Israel advocacy group Stand With Us. In the United Kingdom he presented his research on UNRWA to the  conservative British think tank The Henry Jackson Society in December, 2015. He has also appeared as a speaker for a workshop at the International Institute for Counter-Terrorism in Herzliya, Israel.
He has spoken at many colleges and universities such as Skidmore College, University of Chicago, University of Maryland, Brooklyn College, Cornell University, Elon University, and Denison University.

Published works
His publications include Neither Law Nor Justice: Human Rights in the Occupied Territories Since the Oslo Accords (co-written by PHRMG and B’Tselem, 1996); The State of Human Rights in Palestine I: The practice of torture by the Palestinian Authority (1997), violations of freedom of the press and freedom of expression (1997), deaths in custody (1997), and police brutality (PHRMG); The State of Human Rights in Palestine II. In-depth report on the judicial system (1997), illegal arrests, and long term illegal detention (PHRMG); Fatah and Hamas Human Rights Violations in the Palestinian Occupied Territories from April 2006 to December 2007 (in Fatah and Hamas Human Rights Violations, in The Israel–Palestine Conflict, published by the University of California, Los Angeles in 2011). He also contributes editorial articles to publications such as The Jerusalem Post and Times of Israel.

Awards
The Association for Civil Rights in Israel awarded him its Emil Gruenzweig Memorial Award in 1992. He is also the recipient of the Robert S. Litvak Human Rights Memorial Award granted by the McGill University Faculty of Law and the International Human Rights Advocacy Center, Inter Amicus; in 1999, the International Activist Award given by the Gleitsman Foundation, USA; and the award of Italy’s Informazione Senza Frontiere (Reporters without Borders).

Personal life
Eid calls himself "a proud Palestinian who grew up in a refugee camp and raised a large family". He lives in Jericho.

References

Living people
Human rights
Palestinian human rights activists
Activists
1958 births